K2B may refer to:

 Karma to Burn, a band from Morgantown, West Virginia
 Keswick to Barrow, an annual 40-mile charity walking race in Cumbria, England
 Haplogroup K2b (disambiguation)